"Smile a Little Smile for Me" is the debut single by the Flying Machine.  The song was written by Geoff Stephens and Tony Macaulay.

Lyrical content
The song concerns a woman having difficulty  coming to terms with the final ending of a rocky relationship with a man she loved.  The singer encourages "Rosemarie" to smile in spite of her pain and tears, because she will soon see that her prospects for a future relationship are bright.

Chart history
It reached No. 5 in the U.S. during the fall of the year. It also hit No. 6 on the Adult Contemporary chart.
"Smile a Little Smile for Me" was a bigger hit in Canada. It reached No. 4 on the pop singles chart and No. 6 AC.

Weekly charts

Year-end charts

References

External links
 Lyrics of this song
 

1969 songs
1969 debut singles
Pop ballads
Rock ballads
Songs written by Tony Macaulay
Songs written by Geoff Stephens

Bubblegum pop songs